Sergei Ivanovich Zarudny (1821 in Kolodyazne village, Kupiansk Raion [district], Kharkiv Oblast [province], Ukraine – , 1887 near Nice, France) was a legal scholar, lawyer, senator, and privy councillor in the Russian Empire, mostly during the reign of  Alexander II. He was a supporter of the emancipation reform of 1861, which freed  serfs; and played a key role in writing the Russian Judicial Reform Act of 1864, which established an  independent judiciary and extended the right to a trial by jury to all defendants.

Sources
  English translation of the above.  "Butkov, notifying Zarudny of the subsequent highest gratitude for his efforts in drafting the [Emancipation] decree on February 19 [1861], added that he was 'especially pleased to hand over the highest resolution to Zarudny, as one of the most active participants in the work.' Zarudny valued the gold 'peasant' medal he received at that time above all other awards. ... The closest witness to Zarudny's works [on judicial reform], V.P. Butkov, handing over to him on November 22, 1864 the first copy of the just-printed judicial statutes, indicated in the inscriptions on it that 'the first copy should rightfully belong to Sergey Ivanovich, as the person to whom the new judicial reform in Russia owes its existence more than others.'"
  English translation of the above.

See also 
Alexander Sergeyevich Zarudny (1863–1934) – Sergei's oldest son, a lawyer who defended clients in the trials by jury made possible by the 1864 judicial reform his father chiefly wrote; later a Minister of Justice during the [first] Russian Republic.
Emancipation reform of 1861
Judicial reform of Alexander II
Reform movement#Russia 1860s

References 

ru:Зарудный, Сергей Иванович
uk:Зарудний Сергій Іванович

1821 births
1887 deaths
People from Kharkiv Oblast
19th-century lawyers from the Russian Empire
Senators of the Russian Empire
People from Saint Petersburg